Anvarjon Soliev (born 5 February 1978) is a retired Uzbekistani football striker and football coach.

Early life 
He was born in Turakurgan of Namangan region.

Career

Navbahor Namangan
Firstly he played in Yoshlik football team. Then he continued in Navbahor Namangan. In 1998, he won with Navbahor Uzbek Cup. In 2001, he moved to Pakhtakor.

Pakhtakor
Soliev played seven seasons for Pakhtakor, after he moved in 2008 to another rising capital club Kuruvchi. With Pakhtakor he won 6 times champion of Uzbekistan and 5 Uzbek Cup titles, before leaving the club.

Bunyodkor
In his first season for Bunyodkor Soliev scored 12 goals in league matches. He is currently top scorer of the club in Uzbek League with 46 goals (as of 21 November 2012), followed by Rivaldo and Server Djeparov. With 16 goals Soliev is one of the leading all-time topscorers of AFC Champions League, having scored eight of them for Bunyodkor.

On 18 July 2013 he moved back to Pakhtakor Tashkent.

As of the end of the 2015 Uzbek League season he won his eighth championship title with Pakhtakor. With 12 Uzbek League championships and nine Uzbek Cups, Soliev is the all-time most honoured player among Uzbekistani players. Soliev won his Uzbekistan champion titles playing for three clubs.

He is a member of Gennadi Krasnitsky club of Uzbek top scorers with over 100 goals, scoring (as of 22 November 2015) 228 goals in the league, cup, AFC Champions League and in official games for the national team.

Managing career
In the middle of 2016 he retired as a player and started his managing career, as assistant coach in Pakhtakor-2. In December 2016 he joined the Navbahor Namangan coaching staff.

International
He played for the Uzbekistan national football team, and played 48 matches and scored eight goals after his debut in 2001.

Honours

Club
 Navbahor
 Uzbek League (1): 1996
 Uzbek Cup (1): 1998

 Pakhtakor
 Uzbek League (8): 2002, 2003, 2004, 2005, 2006, 2007, 2014, 2015
 Uzbek Cup (6): 2002, 2003, 2004, 2005, 2006, 2007
 CIS cup: 2007
 AFC Champions League semi-final (2): 2003, 2004

 Bunyodkor
 Uzbek League (3): 2008, 2009, 2011
 Uzbek Cup (2): 2008, 2012
 AFC Champions League semi-final (2): 2008, 2012

Individual
 Uzbekistan Player of the Year 3rd: 2005
 Uzbek League Top Scorer: 2005 (29 goals)
 Gennadi Krasnitsky club: 228 goals (as of 22 November 2015)

Player statistics

Goals for Senior National Team

References

External links
 
 Profile at KLISF
 

1978 births
People from Namangan Region
2004 AFC Asian Cup players
Association football midfielders
FC Bunyodkor players
FC Nasaf players
Living people
Navbahor Namangan players
Pakhtakor Tashkent FK players
Uzbekistan international footballers
Uzbekistani footballers